Federico Valietti (born 25 January 1999) is an Italian professional footballer who plays as a right back for  side Vicenza, on loan from Genoa.

Club career

Inter Milan
He is a product of Inter youth teams and began to represent their U19 squad in the 2016–17 season. He made his debut for the senior squad on 9 July 2017 in a friendly against WSG Wattens. He also participated with the squad in the 2017 International Champions Cup.

Genoa
On 29 June 2018, he signed with Genoa, with Inter holding the buy-back option.

Loan to Crotone
On 13 August 2018, he joined Serie B club Crotone on a season-long loan.

He made his Serie B debut for Crotone on 9 November 2018 in a game against Perugia as an 84th-minute substitute for Salvatore Molina.

Loans to Virtus Entella and Carrarese
On 9 July 2019, Valietti joined Virtus Entella on loan until 30 June 2020. He did not make any league appearances for Entella, and on 31 January 2020 he moved on a new loan to Serie C club Carrarese. On 5 October 2020 he returned to Carrarese on another loan.

Loan to Pordenone
On 13 August 2021, Valietti joined Pordenone on loan until 30 June 2023.

Loan to Vicenza
On 1 September 2022, Valietti moved on a two-year loan at Vicenza.

Career statistics

Club

International
He was first called up to represent his country in early 2014 for Italy national under-15 football team friendlies. He continued to represent his country in every age bracket up to Under-20 team, all in friendlies, he was not selected for any UEFA competition matches.

References

External links
 

1999 births
Footballers from Bergamo
Living people
Italian footballers
Italy youth international footballers
Association football defenders
Inter Milan players
Genoa C.F.C. players
F.C. Crotone players
Virtus Entella players
Carrarese Calcio players
L.R. Vicenza players
Serie B players
Serie C players